The 2008–09 season is Sydney FC's fourth season of football (soccer) in Australia, and will compete in the 2008–09 A-League season.

2008-09 Squad

Pre-season
Sydney commenced pre-season training on 28 April 2008, and have been actively promoting the club to the Sydney community in the lead up to the season.

A number of friendly matches against NSW Premier League opposition are expected to be arranged in May and June.

Sydney played their first pre-season match against NSW Premier League side Blacktown City Demons at Gabbie Stadium which ended in a 0–0 draw. The match was significant in which Michael Enfield played his first game in almost a season, and fellow American Matt Taylor played his first trial game for the club.
Sydney lost their 2nd trial match against Sutherland a week later losing 2–1 on artificial turf. Jacob Timpano scored Sydney's goal late in the 1st half. It was his first goal for the club after almost a year and a half on the sidelines through injury. Sydney's 3rd and final Pre-season friendly ended up a 2–0 win over Manly United, with Newly signed 17yr old Chris Payne scoring the double for the Sky Blues against his former club. It is their last Pre-season friendly before starting in the annual pre-season cup which starts later this month.

A-League Pre-Season Challenge Cup
Sydney have been drawn into Group B for the A-League Preseason Challenge Cup along with Queensland Roar, Central Coast Mariners and Wellington Phoenix.

Fixtures

On a freezing cold night at Campbelltown Sydney came victorious against Queensland Roar 2–1. After a scoreless 1st half, Queensland scored first through their new Dutch import, before Sydney hit back minutes later through newly signed 17-year-old Chris Payne, late in the 2nd Half Alex Brosque was fouled near the penalty area and former Perth Glory midfielder Mitchell Prentice took a shot that fired into the top right corner of the net. Sydney next travel up to Gosford To play the Central Coast Mariners.

Sydney played the Mariners up at Bluetongue Stadium on 27 July. Central Coast had recently been in the News with former Socceroos and Manchester United goalkeeper Mark Bosnich reportedly signing a 2-year contract. Sydney dominated the first 15 minutes until Brad Porter scored 2 minutes before half time. Sydney had several excellent chances early in the 2nd through Alex Brosque and Terry McFlynn but Bosnich denied any Sydney goal. 2 late goals for Central Coast through former Sydney player Sasho Petrovski and Nik Mrdja. Sydney had a 70th minute Steve Corica penalty stopped by Bosnich.  Sydney now will hope to get through to the Pre-Season final with a win over Wellington Phoenix at WIN Stadium next Saturday Night.

Sydney played Wellington at WIN stadium, needing a victory and the Central Coast Mariners beating the Queensland Roar in order to get into the Pre-Season cup final. Sydney started off well with early goals from Alex Brosque and Iain Fyfe both opening up their goal tally's for the season, and Sydney looked to have the game under control by half time. Until 15 minutes into the 2nd half Wellington got a goal back through Troy Hearfield. A last-man sliding tackle by Dez Giraldi earned Wellington a Penalty, as well as Giraldi's marching orders. The penalty was converted past Sydney's 2nd keeper Ivan Necevski leveling the scores at 2–2. with 9 minutes to go till full-time a defensive mistake cost Sydney the game when Jacob Timpano but a terrible pass-back to Necevski and Wellington's Chinese import Leilei Gao intercepted it, and slotted the ball past a stunned Necevski.  Sydney now go into the start of the 4th A-League season short on players with Alex Brosque, Dez Giraldi, Mitchell Prentice, and Simon Colosimo all out on Suspension, and John Aloisi, Brendon Santalab, and Michael Enfield all injured, as well as Mark Bridge, and Stuart Musialik out on Olyroo duties for the Beijing Olympics.

A-League

Sydney will again compete in the A-League competition.

Home-and-Away fixtures

Round 1

Round 2

Round 3

Round 4

Round 5

Round 6

Round 7

Round 8

Round 9

Round 10

Round 11

Round 12

Round 13

Round 14

Round 15

Round 16

Round 17

Round 18

Round 19

Round 20

Round 21

Player details

Scorers

Transfers
The later parts of the 2007–08 season saw the departure of Mark Rudan to Japanese second division side Avispa Fukuoka and the club released David Zdrilic, Ruben Zadkovich and Patrick da Silva at season's end. Ufuk Talay joined his former teammate Mark Rudan and coach Pierre Littbarski at Avispa Fukuoka the end of the season.

New signings for the 2008–09 season started in earnest in March with the official announcements of Simon Colosimo from Perth, Mark Bridge and Stuart Musialik from Jets and a new marquee player in John Aloisi from the Mariners reportedly with a pay packet of up to A$1.4m a season. With Aloisi joining as the marquee and other signings being under the salary cap, Sydney were unable to retain Brazilian Juninho at the club and he was unceremoniously released during the off-season. Ruben Zadkovich was snatched up by Newcastle but ended up heading over to England on a reported 2-year contract with relegated Premier League team Derby County. Manly United young gun Chris Payne caught Kosmina's eye during a pre-season trial and signed the youngster on a 2-year youth contract. And in mid-July Kosmina signed Wollongong Wolves striker Dez Giraldi on an 8-week loan spell to replace the injured Brendon Santalab.

In

Out

Short-term signings

Loan out

References 

Sydney FC seasons
Sydney Fc Season, 2008-09